Karkan (also Romanized as Karkān) is a village in Chahar Farizeh Rural District, in the Central District of Bandar-e Anzali County, Gilan Province, Iran. Karkan is approximately 2.3 miles (3.7 km) away from the coast of the Caspian Sea. At the 2006 census, its population was 560, in 159 families.

References 

Populated places in Bandar-e Anzali County